is a Japanese footballer who plays for FC Machida Zelvia.

Career
Taiki Hirato joined J1 League club; Kashima Antlers in 25 May 2016, he debuted in J.League Cup (v Júbilo Iwata).

Club statistics
Updated to 23 February 2019.

References

External links

Profile at Kashima Antlers
Profile at Machida Zelvia

1997 births
Living people
Association football people from Ibaraki Prefecture
People from Hitachinaka, Ibaraki
Japanese footballers
J1 League players
J2 League players
Kashima Antlers players
FC Machida Zelvia players
Association football midfielders